The BMW S85B50 is a naturally aspirated V10 petrol engine which replaced the BMW S62 V8 engine in the M5 model and was produced from 2005–2010. It was both BMW's first and only production V10 engine, and the first petrol V10 engine to be available in a production sedan (saloon).

Introduced in the E60 M5, the S85 was inspired by BMW's previous Formula One involvement. Unlike most other BMW M engines, the S85 is not related to a regular production BMW engine.

The BMW S65 V8 engine (used in the E92 M3) is based on the S85.

Nomenclature
As the S85 was BMW's first V10 engine, it was given a new series in the BMW's engine codes. The "60s" were used for V8 engines and the "70s" were used for V12 engines, therefore the V10 was allocated in the "80s" (despite having fewer cylinders than the V12 engines in the "70s".)

The engine code for the related BMW S65 V8 engine reflects its link to the S85. The S65 code was selected to signify that the V8 is largely derived from the S85 minus two cylinders, and not related to BMW's other V8s.

Design 

The S85 has dual overhead camshafts with four valves per cylinder and double-VANOS (variable valve timing). The engine block and cylinder head are constructed from aluminum alloy.

Features include:
 Displacement of 
 Compression ratio of 12.0:1
 10 electronically actuated individual throttle bodies
 Cast aluminum block with bed plate design split at the crankshaft axis
 Valves actuated through non-rotating inverted bucket cam followers
 Oil-cooled, cast aluminium pistons
 Forged steel crankshaft with counterweights, shared crankpins producing an uneven firing interval of 90 or 54 degrees
 Siemens MS S65 engine control unit
 Application of an "ionic current measuring system" for knock sensing. The ionic current system uses a low voltage applied across the spark plugs immediately following the ignition spark, and can detect misfires as well as knock.
 Quasi-dry sump lubricating system where the engine has 2 oil sumps that hold oil, and oil pickup is enhanced by secondary electrical scavenge pumps that feed oil from the smaller sump to the main sump
 Uneven Firing order of 1-6-5-10-2-7-3-8-4-9
 Mass of

Awards 
The S85 has won the following awards at the International Engine of the Year:
 2005 International Engine of the Year, Best Performance Engine, Best Above 4.0 Litre, Best New Engine
 2006 International Engine of the Year, Best Performance Engine, Best Above 4.0 Litre
 2007 Best Performance Engine, Best Above 4.0 Litre
 2008 Best Above 4.0 Litre

Applications 
 2005–2010 E60/E61 M5
 2005–2010 E63/E64 M6
 2009–2010 Wiesmann GT MF5 (and also 2011 Wiesmann Roadster MF5 V10 daHLer Schwaben Folia Black Bat, V10 engine was upgraded to 600 hp)
 2005–2007 Fisker Latigo CS V10 (One prototype and one production car, upgraded from 507 to 650 hp)
 2009–2013 Vermot Veritas RS III (30 cars were built, and used a 600-hp version of the S85 engine)

References

S85
V10 engines
Gasoline engines by model